Alexandra Anastasia Hamilton, Duchess of Abercorn,  (née Phillips; 27 February 1946 – 10 December 2018) was a British peeress and philanthropist. She was the wife of James Hamilton, 5th Duke of Abercorn, and a descendant of Russian poet Alexander Pushkin, in whose honour she founded the Pushkin Trust and the Pushkin prizes.

Early life
Born Alexandra Anastasia Phillips, she was the eldest daughter of Lieutenant Colonel Harold "Bunny" Phillips and Georgina Wernher. Her paternal grandparents were Colonel Joseph Harold John Phillips and Mary Mercedes Bryce, daughter of John Pablo Bryce. Her maternal grandparents were Sir Harold Wernher, 3rd Bt, and Countess Anastasia de Torby, morganatic daughter of Grand Duke Michael Mikhailovich of Russia. Sacha, as she was known to friends and family, had a younger brother and three younger sisters, including Marita Crawley and Natalia, Duchess of Westminster. 

Sacha was born in Tucson, Arizona, where her family was living while her father recovered from tuberculosis. She was christened at St Margaret's Church, Westminster, with Lord Mountbatten, the Duchess of Kent, and Sir William Stephenson among her godparents. Upon returning to the United Kingdom, the family lived at Thorpe Lubenham Hall in Northamptonshire, and later Checkendon Court, in South Oxfordshire. 

She was educated at St Mary's School, Wantage, and in Paris, but her mother forbade university. She had a debutante ball attended by 800 guests including The Queen and the Duke of Edinburgh at Luton Hoo, the Bedfordshire seat of her maternal grandparents, the Wernhers, in the summer of 1964.

Marriage and issue
On 20 October 1966, at the age of 20, Phillips married James Hamilton, Marquess of Hamilton, Member of Parliament for Fermanagh and South Tyrone and son and heir apparent of the 4th Duke of Abercorn, at Westminster Abbey. The Queen and other members of the royal family attended, including Prince Andrew, who was a pageboy.

In June 1979, James succeeded his father as 5th Duke of Abercorn and moved to the family seat, Baronscourt, near Newtownstewart in County Tyrone, Northern Ireland.

The Duke and Duchess had three children and three grandchildren:

 James Harold Charles Hamilton, Marquess of Hamilton (born 19 August 1969); married Tanya Marie Nation on 7 May 2004, had issue: 
 James Alfred Nicholas Hamilton, Viscount Strabane (born 30 October 2005) 
 Lord Claud Douglas Harold Hamilton (born 12 December 2007)
 Lady Sophia Alexandra Hamilton (born 8 June 1973); married Anthony Loyd on 7 September 2002, divorced 2005, no issue
 Lord Nicholas Edward Hamilton (born 5 July 1979); married Tatiana Kronberg on 30 August 2009, had issue

Sacha was a close friend of Prince Philip, Duke of Edinburgh, who often came carriage driving at Baronscourt. Her younger sister, the Duchess of Westminster, is a godmother of Prince William, Prince of Wales. Her husband was a first cousin of John, 8th Earl Spencer, father of Diana, Princess of Wales.

The Duchess died on 10 December 2018 at the age of 72 following an illness.  Following a private funeral, she was buried at Baronscourt Parish Church, County Tyrone, Northern Ireland. A memorial service was held at St Anne's Cathedral, Belfast, on 30 May 2019, which was attended by the Duke of York.

Philanthropy and public roles
A trained psychologist, she ran workshops throughout Ireland and Great Britain. The Duchess was the founder of the Pushkin Prizes and the Pushkin Trust, organizations promoting art therapy for young people. The Duchess held many patronages, such as Abercorn House at Cambridge House Grammar School, the Omagh Community Youth Choir and the BEARR Trust. She was honorary secretary of the Northern Ireland Centre for Trauma & Transformation in Omagh, County Tyrone. Her work in Omagh was in response to the 1998 Omagh bombing.

Honours

National honours
  14 June 2008: Officer of the Most Excellent Order of the British Empire (OBE)
  11 November 1991: Officer (Sister) of the Most Venerable Order of the Hospital of St John of Jerusalem (OStJ)

Academic honours
  2003: Honorary Doctorate from the University of Ulster

Miscellaneous honours
 2006: Princess Grace Humanitarian Award

Ancestry

References

1946 births
2018 deaths
People from Tucson, Arizona
English people of German descent
English people of Peruvian descent
English people of Russian descent 
British duchesses by marriage
Wernher family
Officers of the Order of the British Empire
Recipients of the Medal of Pushkin
People educated at St Mary’s School, Wantage
People educated at Heathfield School, Ascot